Claude Chauveau (1861-1940) was a French politician. He served as a member of the French Senate from 1910 to 1940, representing Côte-d'Or.

References

1861 births
1940 deaths
People from Côte-d'Or
French Senators of the Third Republic
Senators of Côte-d'Or